Allegiance is the duty which a subject or citizen is widely expected to owe to the state to which he or she belongs.

Allegiance may also refer to:

Arts, entertainment, and media

Games
 Allegiance (video game), a 2000 computer game originally by Microsoft
 Allegiance: War of Factions, a social/political collectible card game set in a medieval city-state undergoing political turmoil

Literature
 Allegiance (novel), a novel set in the Star Wars galaxy that was released in January 2007 by Del Rey
 Allegiance, a 2012 fantasy novel by Cayla Kluver and the second book in the Legacy series
 Allegiance, a 2015 historical legal thriller about Japanese-American internment in WWII, authored by law professor Kermit Roosevelt III

Music 
 Allegiance (American band), a retired hardcore band from San Francisco
 Allegiance (Australian band), a retired thrash metal band from Perth, Australia
 Allegiance (As Blood Runs Black album), the debut album of deathcore band As Blood Runs Black
 Allegiance (Firewind album), the fourth full-length album by Firewind
 "Allegiance", a song by Dimmu Borgir from their 2003 album Death Cult Armageddon

Television 
 "Allegiance" (Person of Interest), a 2014 episode of Person of Interest
 "Allegiance" (Star Trek: The Next Generation), a 1990 episode of Star Trek: The Next Generation
 "Allegiance" (Stargate SG-1), a 2002 episode of Stargate SG-1
 Allegiance (TV series), an American remake of the Israeli TV series The Gordin Cell
 "Allegiance", a 2013 episode of NCIS: Los Angeles

Other uses in arts, entertainment, and media
 Allegiance (film), a 2012 American film about the Iraq War
 Allegiance (musical), a 2012 musical about the Japanese American internment experience

Other uses
 Allegiance (company), a voice of customer and enterprise feedback management technology platform

See also
 Allegiant (disambiguation)